Jan Anton Garemyn (or Garemijn) (1712-1799), a Flemish painter and engraver, was born at Bruges, and studied under Louis Boons and Matthias de Visch. He painted numerous altar-pieces for the churches at Bruges and Courtrai; and others for private persons at Brussels and Ghent. His pictures are highly esteemed by his countrymen for their warmth of colouring. He painted several pictures in imitation of Rembrandt and Teniers, and designed and executed several of the plates for the Chronyke van Vlaenderen, published in 1736.

His highest selling painting, A village scene with peasants in the foreground, sold for $45,929 USD in 2001.

References

 

1712 births
1799 deaths
Artists from Bruges
18th-century Flemish painters